Ayron Jones (born August 23, 1986 in Seattle, Washington) is an American guitarist, singer and songwriter. His music blends elements of grunge, rock, hip-hop, soul and other genres. After years performing in local venues of his hometown Seattle with his trio Ayron Jones and the Way, he was noticed by producer Sir Mix-a-Lot and lead an independent career until he signed with John Varvatos/Big Machine. His first major album was released on May 21, 2021.

As an opening act or fellow participant in festivals, he has shared the stage with names such as B.B. King, Guns N' Roses, the Zombies, Patti Smith,  Living Colour, The Presidents of the United States of America, Janelle Monae, Public Enemy, Rakim, Robin Trower, Spearhead, Train, Jeff Beck, Slipknot, Lamb of God, Theory of a Deadman, Run-DMC and The Rolling Stones.

He has participated in festivals such as Bumbershoot, Mount Baker Rhythm and Blues Festival, SXSW, Sasquatch! Music Festival and Summer Meltdown.

Early life 
Ayron Jones was born at the University of Washington Medical Center to a 19-year-old mother and a father who "was never around". At the age of four, he was adopted by his aunt while his parents struggled with drug addiction.

As a religious person, his aunt surrounded him with soul and gospel music, which instilled a passion for music on him. Jones learned how to play the piano, the drums and the guitar alone and later chose the latter as his main instrument. He also took violin lessons at school, and despite saying that he was "terrible" at the instrument, he recognized that learning it helped him better understand music theory and allowed him to acquire some compositional skills. His first instrument was an acoustic guitar given by his neighbor. Later, he bought himself a Squier Stratocaster. The first song he learned to play was Lenny Kravitz's "Fly Away".

At the age of 19, he started to perform at local bars. He would later recall being treated poorly in some places prior to performing, because he and his band "didn't look like the usual Rock band". He also claims that police were called numerous times to intervene in his shows following noise complaints.

Career

2010–2017: Beginnings, Dream and Audio Paint Job 
In 2010, he founded the trio Ayron Jones and the Way, inspired by important rock trios like Cream, Jimi Hendrix Experience, Stevie Ray Vaughan and Double Trouble and Prince and The Revolution. In 2012, while performing at a dive bar in Seattle, they were discovered by Sir Mix-a-Lot, who made it possible for them to record their debut, self-released album one year later. The effort was titled Dream and featured DeAndre Enrico on bass and Kai Van De Pitte on drums, with Mix-a-Lot producing it pro bono. The album was released on October 29, 2013, with a release show taking place a couple of days later, on November 2.

Following his debut, he was invited to work with Deep Cotton, but rejected an offer to tour extensively with them in order to focus on his solo career. In 2015, his two band members left the group and he decided to continue as a solo musician.

In early 2017, he signed with the Agency for the Performing Arts. Later that year, on June 2, he released his second album Audio Paint Job, which has been described as "autobiographical". Produced by Barrett Martin (who also performed on the record and distributed it via his own label Sunyata) and Jack Endino, it also featured the Way, at that time consisting of Bob Lovelace on bass and Ehssan Kirimi on drums, and some guests, such as Scarlet Parke on vocals, Andrew Joslyn on strings and Evan Flory-Barnes on the upright bass. The album release show took place on June 24 at the Neptune Theatre.

On November 2, 2017, he guest performed on the Levee Walkers's song "All Things Fade Away".

2020–present: Major career, Child of the State 
In 2020, he signed with Big Machine/John Varvatos and released his debut single "Take Me Away" in the middle of 2020. On October 5, 2020, a video shot in Seattle was released for the song, which discusses his abandonment as a child. The song was produced by Eric Lilavois at London Bridge Studio and featured Lovelace on bass, Joslyn on strings, Martin on drums and Parke on vocals.

On September 20, he performed "The Star-Spangled Banner" before an NFL game between the Seattle Seahawks and the New England Patriots.

In February 2021, he released his second single "Mercy" and its accompanying lyric video, discussing the 2020–2021 United States racial unrest. In the same month, the song was selected as one of the eight Classic Rocks "Tracks of the Week".

In April 2021, he was announced as one of the 25 artists from all the world selected by Fender to take part in the company's Fender Next project, a program that intends to assist the roster with marketing, gear and social media presence.

Also in April, he released his third single, "Spinning Circles", which discusses toxic relationships. It was also selected for another Classic Rock "Tracks of the Week" list released in April, and readers elected it as the second best of the eight.

His third album (the first via a major label), Child of the State, was released on May 21, 2021. In an interview for Loudwire, he said he would be playing the bass in some tracks. It featured the three singles among its tracks and it was elected by Loudwire as the 27th best rock/metal album of 2021.

In August 2022, he released his first single since Child of the State titled "Filthy".

Musical style and influences 
Ayron Jones's music is described as a mixture of blues, hip-hop, grunge, hard rock and soul. Jones himself once described his own sound as "like if Michael Jackson played guitar like Jimi Hendrix in Kurt Cobain's band".

Jones cites the beat as the most important aspect in his approach to songwriting and says he wants his sound to be representative of Seattle. When asked about the usage of noise in his music, he said that he had "developed this theory that what captivates people about an instrument or tone are the imperfections, because that’s the true reflection of human nature. [...] Your imperfections make you perfect."

Jones's playing style has been compared to Gary Clark Jr.'s and Stevie Ray Vaughan's and his singing style has been compared to Michael Jackson's.

He cites Hendrix, Freddie King, B.B. King, Roy Buchanan, Mike McCready, Kim Thayil and Cobain as guitar influences and Vaughan, Stevie Wonder, Dr. Dre, Rage Against the Machine, Nirvana, Soundgarden, Pearl Jam, Derek Trucks and Michael Jackson as general music influences.

Personal life and other activities 
Jones is married and has four children. Since 2017, he resides in Alki Beach, after living in the Central District for all his life until then.

Jones played for the same Ultimate Frisbee team as Sean Foreman (3OH!3) in the 2004 World Championship in Finland.

Discography

Studio albums
 Dream (2013)
 Audio Paint Job (2017)
 Child of the State (2021)
 Chronicles of the Kid (2023)

Singles

Music videos

Awards and nominations 

|-
! scope="row" | 2022
| iHeartRadio Music Awards
| Best New Rock Artist
| Ayron Jones
| 
|

References

External links
 

1986 births
Living people
American blues guitarists
American male guitarists
Lead guitarists
African-American guitarists
African-American rock musicians
American rock guitarists
American rock singers
American rock songwriters
American blues singers
Blues rock musicians
Singer-songwriters from Washington (state)
Guitarists from Washington (state)
American blues singer-songwriters
Big Machine Records artists
21st-century American guitarists
Musicians from Seattle
African-American male singer-songwriters
21st-century African-American male singers